Predator vs. Judge Dredd is an intercompany crossover featuring the galaxy's greatest lawman and the galaxy's greatest hunter. It was originally published in 1997 in serial form in Judge Dredd Megazine and a three-issue miniseries by Dark Horse Comics. It was then collected as a trade paperback.

Characters
Judge Dredd
Judge Schaefer, a Judge from Psi Division who is the great-great-granddaughter of Major Alan "Dutch" Schaefer (Arnold Schwarzenegger's character in the original film).

Plot
The Predator enters the urban jungle of Mega-City One to hunt a challenging prey – the Judges themselves. As the Judges' heads start accumulating in the Predator's trophy room, it is down to Dredd and Schaefer to stop the hunt.

When discussing the Predator, the Judges say it had visited New York. This never happened in the film but did in the Predator comic book story Concrete Jungle, written by Mark Verheiden (which parallels a lot of the themes in the second film).

Collections
The series has been collected as a trade paperback:

Predator vs Judge Dredd, 80 pages, Titan, 1998, 
Predator vs Judge Dredd, 80 pages, Dark Horse Comics, 1999, 
Predator vs Judge Dredd vs Aliens, 176 pages, Dark House Comics, 2014, 
Judge Dredd: The Complete Case Files 27, 304 pages, Rebellion, 2016,

See also
 Judge Dredd vs. Aliens
 Predator, the main comic book series

References

2000 AD profile
Dark Horse page for the trade

1997 comics debuts
Dark Horse Comics limited series
Comics by John Wagner
Crossover comics
Intercompany crossovers
Judge Dredd storylines
Predator (franchise) comics